La Garra may refer to:

 Argentina women's national handball team
 Jorge Luis Mendoza Cárdenas, a suspected Mexican drug lord